Li Sa  (born 3 January 1968) is a Chinese footballer who plays as a goalkeeper for the China women's national football team. She was part of the team at the inaugural 1991 FIFA Women's World Cup. At the club level, she played for the team "Beijing" in China.

References

External links
 

1968 births
Living people
Chinese women's footballers
China women's international footballers
Place of birth missing (living people)
1991 FIFA Women's World Cup players
Women's association football goalkeepers
Footballers at the 1990 Asian Games
Asian Games medalists in football
Asian Games gold medalists for China
Medalists at the 1990 Asian Games